Medora may refer to:

Places
In the United States:
 Medora, Illinois
 Medora, Indiana
 Medora, Kansas
 Medora, Louisville, Kentucky
 Medora, North Dakota
 Medora site, a precolumbian archaeological site in West Baton Rouge Parish, Louisiana
 Medora, Wisconsin, the fictional setting of Aliens in America

People
Medora, heroine of Byron's poem The Corsair, Verdi's opera Il corsaro, and Adam's ballet Le Corsaire
Elizabeth Medora Leigh, daughter of Augusta Leigh and possible daughter of Lord Byron
Medora Vallambrosa, Marquise de Mores (Medora von Hoffman), wife of the Marquis de Mores and namesake of Medora, North Dakota
John Medora, songwriter and record producer

Other
Medora (film), 2013 documentary by Andrew Cohn, Davy Rothbart about a small-town basketball team, the Medora Hornets
 Medora (gastropod), a genus of gastropods in the family Clausiliidae
Medora (horse), a British Thoroughbred racehorse